The Blue is the seventh studio album by the Italian progressive doom/gothic metal band Novembre.

Track listing
 "Anaemia" - 4:34
 "Triesteitaliana" - 4:53
 "Cobalt of March" - 6:01
 "Bluecracy" - 6:06
 "Architheme" - 4:51
 "Nascence" - 4:33
 "Iridescence" - 5:12
 "Sound Odyssey" - 5:31
 "Cantus Christi" - 6:46
 "Zenith" - 7:09
 "Argentic" - 5:27
 "Deorbit" - 6:24

Personnel
Carmelo Orlando - guitars and vocals
Giuseppe Orlando - drums
Massimiliano Pagliuso - guitars 
Luca Giovagnoli - bass
Francesca Lacorossi - female vocals on "Nascence"

References

2007 albums
Novembre albums
Albums with cover art by Travis Smith (artist)